Paolo Agabitini (born 28 March 1959) is an Italian retired footballer. He spent most of his career on S.S.D. Casarano Calcio.

References

1959 births
Living people
Sportspeople from Perugia
Italian footballers
Association football defenders
Serie B players
Ternana Calcio players
S.S. Virtus Lanciano 1924 players
Ascoli Calcio 1898 F.C. players
Ravenna F.C. players
S.S. Maceratese 1922 players
Footballers from Umbria